Merzin Tavaria (born 15 December 1973) is the Chief Creative Director and Co-founder of Prime Focus.  He has been associated with the company since its inception and works in collaboration with the UK, US, Canada and India studios of Prime Focus.

Merzin has worked for about two decades in the media and entertainment industry and is respected for his contribution towards the use of color grading and visual effects in India.

He is also a jury member at various film and advertising festivals, and has been a speaker on many industry related events.

Early life and education 
Merzin grew up in Mumbai and completed his schooling from St. Peter's School, Mumbai in 1991. In 1995, he graduated with a bachelor's degree in Commerce from K.C. College, Mumbai.

Career 

Merzin started his career as teacher at Compufield Computer Institute, where he met Namit Malhotra, Prakash Kurup and Huzefa Lokhandwala. In 1997, they came together and started 'Prime Focus' in a small garage in Mumbai.

Under Prime Focus, Merzin has led teams delivering visual effects for Hollywood films such as The Great Gatsby, Total Recall, White House Down, Sin City: A Dame to Kill For and Brett Ratner's Hercules. Merzin has also directed the visual effects for Bollywood films like Bang Bang!, Kick, Kai Po Che!, Yeh Jawaani Hai Deewani, Dabangg 2, Guzaarish, Housefull 2, Blue, and Ghajini.

In 2010, when Prime Focus pioneered View-D, their proprietary 2D to stereo 3D conversion process, Merzin set up the View-D team of 2000 professionals in India who currently operate out of Prime Focus' Mumbai, Chandigarh and Goa facilities. This team undertook the 3D conversion of Warner Bros.' Clash of the Titans – the first full length feature film to be converted from 2D to 3D. Merzin Tavaria was sought for creative leadership in the 3D conversion of films like Gravity, Guardians of the Galaxy, Transformers: Age of Extinction, World War Z, Men in Black 3, Star Wars: Episode I, II & III, Harry Potter and the Deathly Hallows – Part 2, Transformers: Dark of the Moon, Maleficent, Seventh Son, The Chronicles of Narnia: The Voyage of the Dawn Treader and Ra.One.

Merzin Tavaria launched Prime Focus World's Animation division in 2012. The division holds 100 employees and has worked on projects such as Legends of Chima. The animation division completed 4 seasons of the show and is now working on new projects.

Awards and accolades 

 Apollo Award 2014 for Best VFX in International Feature Film category for Sin City: A Dame to Kill For
 24 FPS Award 2014 for Best VFX in International Feature Film category for Sin City: A Dame to Kill For
 24 FPS Award 2013 for Best VFX in International Feature Film category for White House Down
 Gold Award, Filmcraft (Special Effects), Goafest 2011 for Indigo Airlines 'On Time' Commercial
 CGTantra Community Awards 2011 for Best VFX in Commercial for Zen Estilo ad.
 Apsara Awards 2011 for Best Visual Effects for 'Guzaarish'  
 EME Awards 2011 for Best Film Content 'Guzaarish' 
 EME Awards 2011 for the Best TV Content for Indigo Airlines 'On-Time' advert.
 Award of Excellence at ASIFA IAD 2010 for 'Raavan'  
 Apsara Awards  2010 for 'Best Visual Effects' for  'Blue'  
 IIFA Award 2009 for 'Best Visual Effects' for Ghajini .
 Filmfare Award 2009 for 'Best VFX in a Motion Picture' - Love Story 2050
 FICCI BAF Jury Award for 'Best VFX Shot of the Year' - Love Story 2050 
 24fps Award 2008 for 'Outstanding Contribution to Visual Effects' - Love Story 2050  
 FICCI BAF Award 2008 for 'Best VFX in a Commercial' for Honda CBZ "Hero"

Filmography

International films

Bollywood

Commercials

Indian

International

Personal life 

Merzin lives in Mumbai with his spouse of 15 years Vinita Tavaria, daughter Natasha Tavaria and son Malcolm Tavaria.

Other interests 

Merzin is a gaming enthusiast and is passionate about cars and bikes. He is also fond of 80's Hindi music.

References

Businesspeople from Mumbai
Living people
1973 births